Laila Pakalniņa (born 4 June 1962) is a Latvian film director and screenwriter. She has directed more than 20 films since 1991. Her film Kurpe was screened in the Un Certain Regard section at the 1998 Cannes Film Festival.

Filmography
 Vela (1991)
 Doms (1991)
 Annas Ziemassvētki (1992)
 Baznīca (1993)
 Prāmis (1996)
 Pasts (1996)
 Ozols (1997)
 Kurpe (1998)
 Tusya (2000)
 Papa Gena (2001)
 Mostieties! (2001)
 Mārtiņš (2002)
 Pitons (2003)
 Visions of Europe (2004)
 Buss (2004)
 Leiputrija (2004)
 Teodors (2006)
 Ūdens (2006)
 Ķīlnieks (2006)
 Par dzimtenīti (2008)
 Dawn (2015)
 Zirdziņ, hallo! (2017)

References

External links

1962 births
Living people
People from Liepāja
Latvian film directors
Latvian women film directors
Latvian screenwriters
Lielais Kristaps Award winners